Echo Valley Airport  is located in Echo Valley, British Columbia, Canada.

The airport is a private landing strip for the exclusive use of Echo Valley Ranch & Spa guests. 
In 1999 the strip was paved and extended to 3416 ft long x 60 ft wide. AvGas and jet fuel are available; other facilities are within a five-minute walk of where planes are parked.

The landing strip identifier is CBJ4, and is included in the "Canadian Flight Supplement" and shown on navigational charts.

References

External links
Page about this airport on COPA's Places to Fly airport directory

Registered aerodromes in British Columbia
Thompson-Nicola Regional District